Atique Islam is a Bangladeshi academic. He is the current Vice-chancellor of North South University.

Education and career
Islam has B.Com and M.Com degrees from the University of Dhaka. He obtained another master's from the University of New South Wales and a Ph.D. from the University of Sydney.

Islam served as the pro-vice-chancellor of Edith Cowan University in Australia and the Dean of the Faculty of Business and Government at the University of Canberra. He is a fellow of CPA Australia and a member of the Institute of Chartered Accountants in Australia and New Zealand.

References

Living people
University of Dhaka alumni
University of New South Wales alumni
University of Sydney alumni
Vice-Chancellors of North South University
Year of birth missing (living people)
Academic staff of the North South University